The Tamarac River is a tributary of Pain de Sucre Lake (La Tuque), flowing north of the St. Lawrence River, first in Senneterre (MRC of La Vallée-de-l'Or Regional County Municipality, in Abitibi-Témiscamingue and in the territory of La Tuque, in the administrative region of Mauricie, in Quebec, in Canada.

This stream runs entirely in a small valley in forest area. This area is without resort.

The surface of the Tamarac River is generally frozen from the beginning of December until the beginning of April.

Geography

Toponymy 
The toponym "Tamarac River" was formalized on December 5, 1968 at the Commission de toponymie du Québec, when it was created.

See also

References

External links 

La Vallée-de-l’Or
La Tuque, Quebec
Rivers of Abitibi-Témiscamingue
Rivers of Mauricie
Landforms of Gatineau